Oakwood School is a community secondary school located in Horley, Surrey, England. It is co-educational and caters for students in the 11-16 age range in that it does not have a sixth form.

History
Oakwood was opened in 1989 following the merger of Court Lodge Comprehensive (shut down on 31 August 1989) and Horley Comprehensive (Secondary Modern) School.

Its Headteachers have been:
Andy Thompson: 1989 - 2007
Sue Child: 2007 - 2015
Simon Potten: 2015 - Current

Ofsted
At the Ofsted inspection in November 2013, the school was judged to be Grade 2 - Good. This followed its previous inspection in 2012 where it was rated Grade 3 - Satisfactory and was removed from special measures.

Facilities
The school has a sports centre which is managed by Blue Leisure and includes a fitness gym, astroturf five-a-side pitches, as well as sports halls for a variety of activities.

New and updated Drama suite and increased seating areas with table-tennis tables, computers run on Windows 10 and have all been recently updated

Oakwood was originally the preferred site for the new Horley leisure centre, but unforeseen costs made the site uneconomical. The new leisure centre is currently under construction on the site of the former Court Lodge Comprehensive.

The school also hosts the Horley detachment of the Army Cadet Force.

Extended confederation
Oakwood is a founder member of the Horley Learning Partnership, an extended confederation which incorporates the Horley SureStart Children’s Centre.

Notable alumni
Guntur Dwiarmein, Taekwondo's youngest ever UK Champion
Robert Emms (born  1986), actor
Suzanna Kempner, stand-up comedian
Faye White, former captain of England women's national football team

References

External links
School website

Secondary schools in Surrey
Community schools in Surrey
Horley